Salaqi (Mongolian:) is the central town of Tumed Right Banner. It is under the administration of Baotou City, Inner Mongolia, People's Republic of China. 

Historically, Salaqi was a Ting(zh) (薩拉齊廳) and then a county (薩拉齊縣), ruling Baotou as a town within. After several alterations in mid-20th century, Tumed Right Banner was established and Salaqi became a town; but the name Salaqi is still widely used by people in Hetao area to refer to the accent, the disposition and other features of Salaqi locals.

Salaqi is also a railway station on the Beijing–Baotou Railway.

References

External links
行政区划网 - www.xzqh.org

Township-level divisions of Inner Mongolia